The Gettysburg Railway  was a Pennsylvania short-line railroad of RailAmerica that operated on  between Gettysburg and Mount Holly Springs.  The line shipped freight for local companies, interchanged with Conrail at Carlisle Junction in Mount Holly Springs, and operated a tourist railroad under a subsidiary, Gettysburg Scenic Rail Tours. In 1996, the Gettysburg Railway company was created to operate the Gettysburg Railroad purchased by RailAmerica's Delaware Valley Railroad Company (sold to Pioneer RailCorp's Gettysburg and Northern Railroad in 2001).

See also
List of defunct Pennsylvania railroads

References

Defunct companies based in Pennsylvania
Defunct Pennsylvania railroads
Railway companies disestablished in 2001
Railway companies established in 1996
RailAmerica
1996 establishments in Pennsylvania
2001 disestablishments in Pennsylvania